North Lane railway station was the original station of the Canterbury and Whitstable Railway in Canterbury, Kent, United Kingdom. It opened in 1830, closed to passengers in 1846 and to freight in 1891.

History
The station opened with the Canterbury and Whitstable Railway on 3 May 1830. The South Eastern Railway took over the Canterbury and Whistable in 1844. North Lane station closed to freight in 1891. The site of the station subsequently became a coal depot forming part of the goods yard of Canterbury West station until the 1980s. Since closure of the coal depot the land was sold and is now covered by housing development although the former weighbridge house remains.

References

Citations

Sources
 
 

History of Canterbury
Railway stations in Great Britain opened in 1830
Railway stations in Great Britain closed in 1891
1830 establishments in England
1891 disestablishments in England
Disused railway stations in Kent
Former South Eastern Railway (UK) stations